This is a list of major land trusts in the state of Connecticut.

See also
 List of nature centers in Connecticut
 Connecticut Forest and Park Association

References
 Connecticut Land Conservation Council: Find a Land Trust

 
Land trusts